Agim Rrahman Krasniqi is an ethnic Albanian former insurgent leader based in the village of Kondovo near Skopje, the capital of North Macedonia.

Biography
Krasniqi was one of the commanders of the Albanian National Army insurgency in Macedonia 2001. He remained active as the leader of an armed group after the Ohrid Agreement.

Activities in Kondovo
Agim Krasniqi and an army of 80 soldiers controlled the region of the village of Kondova twice (first between July and December 2004, and later between February and August 2005) that accompanied the governmental vote of the time. Through the media, Krasniqi threatened to shell Skopje and his men kidnapped and beat four police officers.

Attack in Vratnica 2005
In July 2005 Agim Krasniqi's group was involved in the attack on the police station in the village of Vratnica.

Charges against Agim Krasniqi
Starting in September 2004, arrest warrants were issued against him for illegal possession of weapons, kidnapping and theft. In February 2007 Agim Krasniqi and his group were pleaded not guilty on charges of acts of terror.

Support

See also
Insurgency in the Republic of Macedonia
Liberation Army of Chameria
National Liberation Army (North Macedonia)
Ali Ahmeti
Greater Albania

External links
music about Agim Krasniqi

References 

Albanian nationalism in North Macedonia
Albanian nationalists
Albanian separatism
Living people
Albanians in North Macedonia
Macedonian Muslims
Year of birth missing (living people)